Pavle Kozjek (15 January 1959 – 25 August 2008) was a Slovenian mountaineering pioneer and a photographer.

Kozjek was born in Setnica near Polhov Gradec, SR Slovenia, Yugoslavia. He was a member of the Ljubljana Matica Alpine Club. In 1997, he was the first Slovene climber to ascend Mount Everest without supplemental oxygen. In October 2006, he led a new route up the southeastern face of Cho Oyu in less than 15 hours and took photographs of Nangpa La shootings - an ambush of unarmed Tibetan pilgrims by Chinese border guards attempting to leave Tibet via the Nangpa La pass. For his accomplishments he received the Piolet d'Or 2006 Spectators Choice.

In August 2008, Kozjek participated in an expedition with Dejan Miškovič and Gregor Kresal trying to climb Muztagh Tower in the Karakoram, Pakistan. On 25 August 2008, he fell from the mountain through a cornice and was reported dead a few days later. He is the 19th Slovene to die in the Himalayas.

References

External links 

 Kozjek's personal blog

1959 births
2008 deaths
Slovenian mountain climbers
Mountaineering deaths
Sport deaths in Pakistan
Accidental deaths from falls
People from the Municipality of Dobrova-Polhov Gradec